The Church of St. Andrew is a historic Episcopal church located at Arthur Kill and Old Mill Roads on the north side of Richmondtown in Staten Island, New York.

The congregation was founded in 1708. The first church was built in 1708–1712 and expanded in 1770. The church was used as a hospital by the British during the American Revolutionary War, and later was heavily damaged by fire in 1867 and 1872. The church was rebuilt about 1872 in a Gothic style of fieldstone with stop-ended chamfered red brick trim. The attached Burch Hall was erected in 1924 in a matching style.

It was designated a New York City landmark in 1967 and added to the National Register of Historic Places in 2000.  The 1818 rectory is listed on the National Register of Historic Places as the Moore-McMillen House.

Cemetery and notable burials
The churchyard contains the graves of several prominent Staten Island families, including a number of Woods, and a prominent mausoleum to the Johnston Family. Other notable burials include:

 Rev. Richard Charlton (1705–1777), one of the church's earliest rectors and the maternal grandfather of Elizabeth Ann Seton, the first native-born citizen of the United States to be canonized by the Roman Catholic Church. Mother Seton's brother and sister are also buried here.
 Capt. Timothy Green Benham (1793–1860), Navy Commander and father of Admiral Andrew E. K. Benham.
 Obadiah Bowne (1822–1874), member of the 32nd United States Congress and a presidential elector.
 Richard Bayley (1745–1801), first chief health officer of New York City and father of Elizabeth Ann Seton.
 Henry Crocheron (1772–1819), member of the 14th United States Congress. 
 Jacob Crocheron (1774–1849), member of the 21st United States Congress.
 James Guyon Jr. (1778–1846), member of the New York State Assembly and the 16th United States Congress.

See also
List of New York City Designated Landmarks in Staten Island
National Register of Historic Places listings in Richmond County, New York

References

External links
Church of St. Andrew website

Episcopal church buildings in Staten Island
Properties of religious function on the National Register of Historic Places in Staten Island
19th-century Episcopal church buildings
Building and structure fires in New York City
Cemeteries in Staten Island
Anglican cemeteries in the United States
Gothic Revival church buildings in New York City
Churches in Staten Island
New York City Designated Landmarks in Staten Island
Church fires in the United States
Religious organizations established in 1708
Richmondtown, Staten Island